Vimanam amy refer to:

Shikhara, the rising roof of a Hindu temple in North India
Vimanam (tower), which crowns the innermost sanctum of a South Indian temple (Dravidian style of architecture)
Vimanam (game), a traditional boardgame in India
Vimaanam, 2017 Malayalam film